Joseph Jean Pierre Sévigny (born September 8, 1971) is a Canadian former professional ice hockey player who played in the National Hockey League (NHL).

Playing career
As a junior, he played for the Verdun Junior Canadiens and Saint-Hyacinthe Laser of the Quebec Major Junior Hockey League. He was drafted in the third round of the 1989 NHL Entry Draft by the Montreal Canadiens. A left-winger, he was for many years considered to be one of their top prospects. Sévigny was later a member of the Canadian national team that won the gold medal at the 1991 World Junior Ice Hockey Championships.

Sévigny went long stretches without scoring and spent most of his six years in the Canadiens' organization playing for their minor-league affiliate, the Fredericton Canadiens. He appeared in only 75 regular-season games with Montreal. He later signed as a free agent with the New York Rangers, where he appeared in three more NHL games in 1997–98.

Sévigny continued to play professionally at various minor-league levels and in Europe until 2006. Following a stint coaching Les Lions du Collège St-Lawrence of the Quebec AAA Junior Hockey League, in 2007 he became the head coach of the Quebec Radio X of the Ligue Nord-Américaine de Hockey, a low-level professional league based in Quebec.

Career statistics

Regular season and playoffs

International

Awards and honours

References

External links
 

1971 births
Living people
Fredericton Canadiens players
French Quebecers
Hartford Wolf Pack players
Long Beach Ice Dogs (IHL) players
Montreal Canadiens draft picks
Montreal Canadiens players
New York Rangers players
Orlando Solar Bears (IHL) players
Ice hockey people from Quebec
Quebec Citadelles players
Saint-Hyacinthe Laser players
Sportspeople from Trois-Rivières
Straubing Tigers players
Verdun Junior Canadiens players
Canadian ice hockey left wingers